Nathan David Gerbe (born July 24, 1987) is an American former professional ice hockey player. He last played for the Columbus Blue Jackets of the National Hockey League (NHL). He previously played with Genève-Servette HC of the National League (NL) and for the Carolina Hurricanes and the Buffalo Sabres in the National Hockey League (NHL). At 5 feet 4 inches tall, Gerbe is the shortest skater in NHL history, and the second shortest player in NHL history behind goaltender Roy Worters.

Playing career

Amateur
As a youth, Gerbe played in the 2001 Quebec International Pee-Wee Hockey Tournament with the Detroit Honeybaked minor ice hockey team.

Gerbe played for the  Boston College Eagles of the Hockey East conference in the NCAA (wearing the number 9), and was drafted by the Buffalo Sabres with the 142nd pick in the 2005 NHL Entry Draft.

In the 2008 Frozen Four, he scored five goals in the final two games, leading his team to the championship, and was named the tournament's most outstanding player. He was also a finalist for the Hobey Baker Award in the same 2007–08 season.

Professional
On the ice, he is known for his skating ability and scoring touch, as evident with 68 points in 43 games in his last year with Boston College. During his tenure with the Buffalo Sabres, the local fans began to call him the "Tasmanian Devil," a reference to his smaller size, but rough style of play. He has also been called "The Gerbil" by local fans in reference to a confrontation with Daniel Carcillo of the Philadelphia Flyers during the 2011 NHL playoffs.

In an interview, Gerbe revealed that he models his game based after retired NHL players Martin St. Louis and Danny Brière, both of whom are also known for their small size and on-ice ability.

On May 6, 2008, Gerbe signed his first professional contract, a three-year, $2.55 million contract with the Buffalo Sabres. He scored his first NHL preseason goal in a loss to the Montreal Canadiens on September 22. On December 6, 2008, he was recalled by the Sabres, and played in his first NHL regular-season game, a win over the Tampa Bay Lightning. On December 13, Gerbe recorded his first NHL point against the New Jersey Devils by assisting a Drew Stafford goal. Gerbe was awarded the Dudley "Red" Garrett Memorial Award for rookie of the year in the 2008–09 season of the AHL. He scored his first career NHL goal on December 9, 2009, against the Washington Capitals. On April 26, 2010, he scored his first NHL postseason goal against the Boston Bruins.

On January 21, 2011, he scored two goals in five seconds against the New York Islanders, setting a franchise record for the fastest two goals by one player. On June 29, 2011, Gerbe re-signed with the Buffalo Sabres to a three-year deal worth $1.42 million per season.

Upon completion of the lockout-shortened 2012–13 season, Gerbe was placed on waivers by the Sabres on July 3, 2013, with the intention of buying out the remainder of his contract. A free agent, Gerbe later agreed to a one-year, two-way contract with the Carolina Hurricanes on July 26, 2013.

On June 24, 2014, Nathan Gerbe re-signed with the Hurricanes on a two-year, one-way contract. The deal pays Gerbe $1.5 million in 2014–15, and $2 million in 2015–16.

On July 1, 2016, having left the Hurricanes as a free agent, Gerbe signed a one-year deal with the New York Rangers. However, Gerbe did not make the Rangers roster out of training camp and was sent down to the Rangers' AHL team, the Hartford Wolf Pack. When Gerbe refused to report to the Wolf Pack, the Rangers placed him on unconditional waivers for release in order to terminate his contract.

On October 14, 2016, Gerbe agreed to a three-year contract with Genève-Servette HC of the National League A (NLA). Gerbe made his NLA debut on October 21, 2016, on home-ice against HC Ambrì-Piotta. Gerbe scored his first NLA goal on October 29, 2016, on home ice against HC Lugano in a 5-0 win. He finished his first season in Geneva with 28 points (11 goals) in 26 games, before adding two assists in four playoffs games. Gerbe appeared in 13 regular season games with Geneva in the 2017–18 season, scoring five points (one goal), before being taken out of the lineup as a healthy scratch. He racked up an impressive 79 PIM in those 13 games and put up a -4 rating. After an injury sustained during a team practice, Gerbe was put on the trade block by Geneva. He went on to play an additional 6 games, before being released by Geneva on January 20, 2018, in order to get rid of his remaining CHF 1.3 million salary. In his playing time with Geneva, he put up 35 points (13 goals) in 45 games, over 2 seasons.

On January 24, 2018, it was announced that the Columbus Blue Jackets signed Gerbe to a one-year, two-way contract for the rest of the 2017–18 season. After clearing waivers, Gerbe was assigned to the Cleveland Monsters of the AHL. However, after Markus Nutivaara was placed on injured reserve, Gerbe was called up to the NHL on February 21, 2018. He was reassigned to the Monsters a few days later on February 26, 2018, after recording no points in two games. In adding to the depth within the Blue Jackets organization, Gerbe agreed to a two-year, two-way contract extension on March 15, 2018.

Before the 2018–19 season, the Monsters named Gerbe team captain after going without one the previous season.

After 13 professional seasons in the National Hockey League, Gerbe officially announced his retirement on September 14th, 2022. The same day he also announced he’d joined the Nashville Predators organization as the club's forward development coach.

Career statistics

Regular season and playoffs

International

Awards and honors

References

External links

1987 births
American men's ice hockey centers
Boston College Eagles men's ice hockey players
Buffalo Sabres draft picks
Buffalo Sabres players
Carolina Hurricanes players
Cleveland Monsters players
Columbus Blue Jackets players
Genève-Servette HC players
Ice hockey players from Michigan
Living people
People from Oxford, Michigan
Portland Pirates players
River City Lancers players
USA Hockey National Team Development Program players
AHCA Division I men's ice hockey All-Americans